Cándido Néstor Benítez Caballero (born 4 September 1943 in Tacumbú, Paraguay) is a former football defender and coach.

Career
He started his career at Presidente Hayes from his hometown, Tacumbú. From there, he was transferred to Olimpia Asunción which was coached then by the great Aurelio González. While in Olimpia, Benitez won a number of national championships and was called up to the Paraguay national football team in a few occasions. In 1972, he went to Sportivo Luqueño but was only able to play seven games due to an injury that kept him off the field for a few years until 1976 where he came back to play for C.A. Tembetary and retire in the same year.

Benítez holds a record of playing 72 consecutive and uninterrupted games for Olimpia.

As a coach, he managed teams like Independiente de Yaguarón, Olimpia de Itá, 6 de Enero de Lambaré and also worked in the youth divisions of Olimpia and Sol de América.

Titles

Awards

References

1943 births
Living people
Paraguay international footballers
Paraguayan footballers
Club Olimpia footballers
Paraguayan football managers
Club Presidente Hayes footballers
Association football defenders